Dalmate is a rural settlement in the Tiburon commune of the Chardonnières Arrondissement, in the Sud department of Haiti.

See also
Bon Pas
Carrefour Gros Chaudiere
Conete
Galette Sèche
Perion
Plansinte  
Tiburon

References

Populated places in Sud (department)